The  or Taisen Dam is a dam in Hokkaido, Japan. It was planned as a multipurpose rockfill dam by the Hokkaido Ministry of Land, Transportation, Infrastructure Development. It was built upon the Ishikari River for the purpose of flood control and water basin for Asahikawa, Hokkaido, irrigation, and hydropower. The artificial lake created as a result of the construction of the dam is known as the Taisetsu Lake.

Overview 
The Ishikari River Comprehensive development plan was formulated in 1947. The plan included a number of dam projects along the main tributaries which resulted in the construction of Ashibetsu Dam as well as Nakayama Dam. In 1954, Typhoon No. 15 known as  caused damage to the trees in the Kamikawa Basin, as well as many roads in the surrounding area. A survey of the Ishikari River was conducted and in 1955 and construction of the dam began in 1965. The dam was completed in 1975 after 10 years of construction and has allowed for greater control of flooding and supplies up to 20,000 kW of hydropower. In 1981, another major flood occurred and caused considerable damage to the region. The revision of the Ishikari River comprehensive development plan was required which led to the planning and creation of more dams. In 2007, the Chubetsu Dam was completed as part of this project.

References

Dams in Hokkaido
Dams completed in 1975